American Sugar Refining, Inc. is a large privately held cane sugar refining company, with a production capacity of 6.5 million tons of sugar. The company produces a full line of consumer, industrial, food service, and specialty sweetener products.  In 2013, it adopted the corporate brand name ASR Group. Its ownership structure is based on a partnership which includes the Florida Crystals Corporation, part of FLO-SUN, a sugar empire of the Fanjul brothers whose origins go back to Spanish-Cuban sugar plantations of the early 19th century.

Activities
Across North America, American Sugar Refining owns and operates six sugar refineries as well as specialty sweetener production facilities and a strategic warehousing and distribution system that combine to provide seamless production and delivery of its products to customers across the United States, Canada, and Mexico.

The refineries are located in:
Yonkers, New York 
Baltimore, Maryland
Chalmette, Louisiana – This plant celebrated its 100th anniversary in 2009.
Crockett, California, (California and Hawaiian Sugar Company)
Toronto, Ontario, Canada (Redpath Sugar)
Veracruz, Mexico

Former refineries were located in:
Williamsburg, Brooklyn (Domino Sugar Refinery) (the original)
Fort Point, Boston (1902–1958)
Charlestown, Boston (1958–?)

American Sugar Refining, Inc. and the Sugar Cane Growers Cooperative of Florida acquired Domino Sugar from Tate & Lyle 
for $180 million on November 6, 2001.

American Sugar Refining also owns two of its former major competitors, the California and Hawaiian Sugar Company (C&H Sugar), purchased in 2005, and Jack Frost (National Sugar Company) in 2007. Redpath Sugar, Tate & Lyle's European sugar operations, was acquired in 2010.

In Europe, the company owns and operates sugar refineries in England and Portugal, formerly owned by Tate & Lyle.

The company is also the majority shareholder of Belize Sugar Industries, the only sugar mill in Belize.

American Sugar Refining is owned by Florida Crystals Corporation (based in West Palm Beach) and the Sugar Cane Growers Cooperative of Florida (Belle Glade, Florida).

American Sugar Refining's main competitor in the United States for refined cane sugar is Imperial Sugar.

Lyle's Golden Syrup

American Sugar Refining now produces and sells Lyle's Golden Syrup, a brand of golden syrup. According to a news report, the Guinness Book of Records has concluded that the design of the Lyle's Golden Syrup tin, which has remained almost unchanged since 1885, forms Britain's oldest brand.

Sources

External links
 Domino®
 C&H®
 Florida Crystals®, 
 Redpath® 
 Homepage of Florida Crystals Corporation
 Homepage of Sugar Cane Growers Cooperative of Florida.

Sugar companies of the United States
Food manufacturers of the United States
Multinational food companies
Multinational companies headquartered in  the United States
Manufacturing companies based in Florida
Companies based in Palm Beach County, Florida
Privately held companies based in Florida
West Palm Beach, Florida
Food and drink companies established in 1998
1998 establishments in Florida